Gamma Piscium (Gamma Psc, γ Piscium, γ Psc) is a star approximately 138 light years away from Earth, in the zodiac constellation of Pisces. It is a yellow star with a spectral type of G8 III, meaning it has a surface temperature of 4,833 K and is a giant star. It is slightly cooler than the Sun, yet it is 11 solar radii in size and shines with the light of 63 Suns. At an apparent magnitude of 3.7, it is the second brightest star in the constellation Pisces, between Eta and Alpha. Once a white A2 star, it is 5.5 billion years old.

Gamma Piscium moves across the sky at three-quarters of an arcsecond per year, which at 138 light years corresponds to 153 kilometers per second. This suggests it is a visitor from another part of the Milky Way Galaxy; in astronomical terms, it will quickly leave the vicinity of the Sun. Its metallicity is only one-fourth that of the Sun, and visitors from outside the thin disk that composes the Milky Way tend to be metal-poor. Gamma Piscium is part of the asterism known as the "circlet of Pisces."

Naming

Planetary system
In 2021, a gas giant planet was detected by radial velocity method.

In fiction
In Frank Herbert's Dune series, Gamma Waiping (The Chinese name for Pisces)  is the home system of Imperial House Corrino.

References

Pisces (constellation)
Piscium, Gamma
Piscium, 006
114971
G-type giants
8852
219615
BD+02 4648
J23170996+0316563
Planetary systems with one confirmed planet